Beaver is a borough in, and the county seat of, Beaver County, Pennsylvania, United States. As of the 2020 census, the population was 4,838.

History

The area around Beaver was once home to Shawnee Indians, who were later displaced by groups such as the Mingoes and the Lenape. It was part of the Ohio Country that was in dispute during the French and Indian War.

Beaver became the site of Fort McIntosh, a Revolutionary War era Patriot frontier fort. After the war, the fort was the home of the First American Regiment, the oldest active unit in the US Army. The fort was abandoned in 1788 and razed a short time later. By then, the frontier had moved westward and there was no further need for a permanent garrison to protect the area.

The community was laid out in 1792. In 1800, it became the county seat of the newly formed Beaver County. The first county court was established in Beaver in 1804. Growth was steady until 1879 when the arrival of the Pittsburgh and Lake Erie Railroad caused a major growth spurt. In February 1884 a massive flood caused extensive damage. In 1974, an archeological excavation was conducted at the site of Fort McIntosh. The borough became a Tree City USA community in 1997.

Robert Linn was the mayor of Beaver for 58 years, from 1946 to 2004, making him one of the longest-serving mayors in the United States. In late 2007, local officials proposed the consolidation of Beaver with Brighton Township, although nothing came of the initiative.

Geography
Beaver is located at  (40.693865, -80.307944).

Surrounding and adjacent neighborhoods
Beaver  borders three municipalities, with Brighton Township to the north, Bridgewater to the east, and Vanport Township to the west.  Across the Ohio River to the south, Beaver runs adjacent with  Monaca to the southeast, Center Township to the south, and Potter Township to the southwest.

Demographics

As of the 2000 census, of 2000, there were 4,775 people, 2,112 households, and 1,260 families residing in the borough. The racial makeup of the borough was 96.44% White, 2.64% African American, 0.13% Native American, 0.27% Asian, 0.27% from other races, and 0.25% from two or more races. Hispanic or Latino of any race were 0.88% of the population.

There were 2,112 households, out of which 23.2% had children under the age of 18 living with them, 49.6% were married couples living together, 8.1% had a female householder with no husband present, and 40.3% were non-families. 36.9% of all households were made up of individuals, and 19.9% had someone living alone who was 65 years of age or older. The average household size was 2.14 and the average family size was 2.83.

In the borough, the population was spread out, with 19.2% under the age of 18, 6.8% from 18 to 24, 26.7% from 25 to 44, 25.3% from 45 to 64, and 22.1% who were 65 years of age or older. The median age was 43 years. For every 100 females, there were 91.4 males. For every 100 females age 18 and over, there were 88.9 males.

The median income for a household in the borough was $42,113, and the median income for a family was $57,208. Males had a median income of $43,198 versus $26,709 for females. The per capita income for the borough was $24,003. About 3.7% of families and 4.9% of the population were below the poverty line, including 7.1% of those under age 18 and 2.2% of those age 65 or over.

Arts and culture

Beaver Historic District

In 1996, almost the entire community was listed on the National Register of Historic Places as a historic district. Centered on Beaver's commercial Third Street, the buildings in the Beaver Historic District date primarily to the nineteenth century, although some twentieth-century structures are present.  Some of the district's most prominent buildings are five churches and the county courthouse, although most of the district consists of residential neighborhoods.  Included in the boundaries of the district is the Matthew S. Quay House, the National Historic Landmark home of Beaver native Senator Matthew Quay, and the site of Fort McIntosh, a fort constructed in the 1780s.

Library
The Beaver Area Memorial Library started as a small collection of books in the basement of the Beaver Trust Co. in the 1940s and was run by the Beaver Civic Club. It eventually moved into the basement of a former high school on College Avenue in Beaver. In 1948, the Beaver County courts granted a charter for the official formation of the Beaver Memorial Library. A fundraiser was started in Beaver County in 1961 to raise the $130,000 to build a new establishment. The new building, which continues to serve as the public library today, was officially dedicated on April 8, 1962 and open to the public.

Education
Children in Beaver are served by the Beaver Area School District, which also serves Bridgewater, Brighton Township, and Vanport Township. The current schools serving Beaver are:
College Square Elementary School – grades K-2
Dutch Ridge Elementary School – grades 3-6
Beaver Area Middle School – grades 7-8
Beaver Area High School – grades 9-12

Notable people

Daniel Agnew, Chief Justice of the Supreme Court of Pennsylvania
John Allison, lawyer and United States Congressman
Rudyerd Boulton, ornithologist
Robert Linn, mayor of Beaver for 58 years and one of the longest-serving mayors in the U.S.
Amber Mariano, winner of Survivor: All-Stars
Nate Martin, co-founder & CEO of Puzzle Break, first American Escape Room company
Tom McCreery, Major League Baseball player
Matthew Quay, United States Senator
Harrison Holt Richardson, youngest member of the United States Antarctic Service Expedition 
Ralph Francis Scalera, judge of the United States District Court for the Western District of Pennsylvania
Jeff Shaver, former Major League Baseball player
John Skorupan, former NFL Linebacker for the Buffalo Bills and the New York Giants
W. E. Clyde Todd, ornithologist
Ida Geer Weller, concert singer and clubwoman
Florence Wickham, contralto opera singer

See also
 List of cities and towns along the Ohio River

References

External links

Beaver Borough Police Department

1792 establishments in Pennsylvania
Boroughs in Beaver County, Pennsylvania
County seats in Pennsylvania
Historic districts on the National Register of Historic Places in Pennsylvania
National Register of Historic Places in Beaver County, Pennsylvania
Pennsylvania populated places on the Ohio River
Populated places established in 1792